Asian cuisine may refer to:

Asian cuisine
List of Asian cuisines